Fire Down Below is a 1997 American action film starring Steven Seagal and directed by Félix Enríquez Alcalá in his directorial debut. The film also includes cameos by country music performers Randy Travis, Mark Collie, Ed Bruce, Marty Stuart and Travis Tritt, and country-rocker and the Band member Levon Helm, as well as Kris Kristofferson in a supporting role. Steven Seagal plays Jack Taggert, an EPA agent who investigates a Kentucky mine and helps locals stand up for their rights. The film was released in the United States on September 5, 1997.

Plot
In the peaceful Appalachian hills of eastern Kentucky, toxins are being dumped into abandoned mines, causing environmental havoc, but the locals, mindful of their jobs and the power of the mine owners, can do nothing. EPA CID agent Jack Taggert is sent to investigate, after a fellow agent, revealed to be Jack’s friend and partner, is found dead, probably not by accident. The EPA has received an anonymous letter from Jackson, Kentucky, and Taggert goes there undercover to continue his colleague's investigations.

It is discovered that Hanner Coal Company, owned by Orin Hanner Sr., is being paid to dump toxic waste into an abandoned coal mine shaft, so Jack is assigned to go to the small town of Jackson, where his cover is that of assistant and volunteer carpenter to a local church. He stays in a room in the church's basement, and begins his cover work by repairing the roof at a house where one of the children is sick because of the pollution. He attempts to question the family, but they do not have much to say. He has little better results elsewhere; even the man who tipped off the EPA is decidedly taciturn. While testing the water, Taggert wanders into a local marijuana field, and is accosted by the growers. After disarming them, he tells them that he has no interest in arresting them.

The men responsible for the other agent's death soon notice Taggert's presence. As a newcomer to the small local community, he is threatened by Hanner's son Orin, Jr. (Brad Hunt), the incompetent local tool of the company, the corrupt local Sheriff Lloyd Foley, and several thugs that work for them. The thugs in question start by leaving two rattlesnakes in his dwelling; Taggert responds by capturing the snakes alive and leaving them in the pickup that the thugs were driving, causing them to crash. Soon after, five of them attack him while he is buying supplies, and receive a severe beating as a result. Orin then orders one of his truck drivers to arrange an "accident" by running him off the road, but Taggert escapes alive while the driver is killed after falling off an open-pit mine cliff.

While these conflicts are occurring, Taggert strikes up a relationship with Sarah Kellogg, a young woman who lives in the town. She is regarded as an outcast because of her father's murder, a crime of which she was accused but not convicted. Eventually, she agrees to testify against Orin and his people, much to the anger of her estranged brother Earl, who actually committed the murder, after their father found out about his sexual abuse against her. Earl is revealed to be working as one of Hanner's thugs, and sets the church on fire, in the process killing the preacher who was helping Taggert. He then attempts to collapse the mine with Taggert inside it. Taggert escapes, while several mercenaries are killed, including Earl.

With evidence and a witness, Taggert calls the FBI to take Sarah into protective custody. However, they are revealed to be corrupt, and a firefight ensues. Taggert kills one agent, then sends the second back to Orin with a message that he will be coming for him next. However, when Orin is arrested and charged, he gets off with a slap on the wrist for the environmental violations. Taggert goes back into the town and fights his way past the last of Orin Jr's thugs, then demands the truth from him. Orin agrees to turn state's evidence, implicating his father on racketeering, conspiracy, and murder charges. Taggert goes to a casino to arrest Orin, Sr. Upon hearing about the reception awaiting him in federal prison, Orin produces a gun and resists, but Taggert shoots him in the shoulder and he is taken into custody. Taggert then returns to Jackson, where he is reunited with Sarah.

Cast

 Steven Seagal as EPA Agent Jack Taggert
 Marg Helgenberger as Sarah Kellogg
 Harry Dean Stanton as Harry "Cotton Harry"
 John Diehl as EPA Agent Frank Elkins
 Stephen Lang as Earl Kellogg
 Brad Hunt as Orin Hanner Jr.
 Levon Helm as Reverend Bob Goodall
 Kris Kristofferson as Orin Hanner Sr.
 Mark Collie as Hatch
 Alex Harvey as Sims
 Ed Bruce as Sheriff Lloyd Foley
 Amelia Neighbors as Edie Carr
 Richard Masur as EPA Administrator Phil Pratt
 Randy Travis as Ken Adams
 Marty Stuart as himself
 Travis Tritt as himself
 Ernie Lively as Todd
 James Mathers as Marshal Adams
 Kane Hodder as Bodyguard
 Peggy Lynn as Store Clerk
 Patsy Lynn as Store Clerk

Production
The film was shot on location in and around Kentucky; parts of the "truck chase scene" were shot at Natural Bridge State Resort Park. Some of the opening scenes were filmed at Cumberland Falls State Resort Park. The cave scenes were filmed in the Great Saltpetre Cave. This was the third, and final time that Kane Hodder worked with Seagal as a stuntman.

Seagal liked the film in part because it was "kind of an environmental movie." He also enjoyed working with Helgenberger. "While I don’t think she’s a physical, spectacular, drop dead gorgeous woman, at the same time she’s a spectacular actress," said Seagal. "Her performance was wonderful."

Reception

Box office 
Fire Down Below was released on September 5, 1997. It grossed $6 million on its opening weekend in the United States and Canada and went on to gross $16.2 million plus $8.3 million internationally for a worldwide total of $24.5 million.

Critical response
On Rotten Tomatoes the film has an approval rating of 14% based on 28 reviews, with an average rating of 3.5/10. On Metacritic the film has a score of 40 out of 100, based on reviews from 13 critics.
Audiences polled by CinemaScore gave the film an average grade of "B−" on an A+ to F scale.

Accolades
The film was nominated for four Razzie Awards:
 Worst Picture – Julius R. Nasso (lost to The Postman)
 Worst Actor – Steven Seagal (lost to Kevin Costner for The Postman)
 Worst Screen Couple – Seagal and his guitar (lost to Jean-Claude Van Damme and Dennis Rodman for Double Team)
 Worst Original Song – "Fire Down Below" (lost to The Entire Song Score of The Postman)
Seagal was also nominated for Worst Actor at the Stinkers Bad Movie Awards but lost to Tom Arnold for McHale's Navy.

References

External links
 
 
 
 

1997 films
1997 action thriller films
1997 directorial debut films
1997 martial arts films
American action thriller films
American martial arts films
Environmental films
Films about the Federal Bureau of Investigation
Films directed by Félix Enríquez Alcalá
Films scored by Nick Glennie-Smith
Films set in Appalachia
Films set in Kentucky
Films shot in Kentucky
Films with screenplays by Jeb Stuart
Incest in film
Patricide in fiction
Warner Bros. films
1990s English-language films
1990s American films